The 1907 Major League Baseball season was contested from April 11 to October 8, 1907. The Chicago Cubs and Detroit Tigers were the regular season champions of the National League and American League, respectively. The Cubs then defeated the Tigers in the World Series, four games to none (with one tie).

The Philadelphia Phillies set a Major League record for the fewest at bats by a team in a season—4,725.

Standings

American League

National League

Postseason

Bracket

Note: Game 1 ended in a tie.

Managers

American League

National League

Events
 September 25 – Honus Wagner and Fred Clarke of the Pittsburgh Pirates each steal four bases in a 14-1 victory over the New York Giants .

References

External links
1907 Major League Baseball season schedule at Baseball Reference
1907 in baseball history from ThisGreatGame.com

 
Major League Baseball seasons